Yasmani Acosta Fernández (born 16 July 1988) is a Cuban-born naturalized Chilean Greco-Roman wrestler who currently competes at 130 kilograms. Acosta qualified Chile for the 2020 Summer Olympics by winning the gold medal from the 2020 Pan American Olympic Qualification Tournament. Competing for Chile since 2017, he has claimed the 2018 South American Games gold medal, prestigious bronze medals from the 2017 World Championships and the 2019 Pan American Games and has also become a two–time Pan American Continental Championship medalist, earning silver in 2017 and bronze in 2018. Competing for his native Cuba, Acosta most notoriously became the 2011 Pan American champion.

Career 
Acosta started wrestling in Cuba when he was 10 years old. While representing Cuba, he won multiple medals in South American competitions such as the Pan American Championships and the Cerro Pelado International. After competing at the 2015 Pan American Championships in Santiago, Chile, Acosta never returned to Cuba, stating that, since three–time Olympic Champion Mijaín López was always the wrestler who represented Cuba at the biggest tournaments in his weight class, he would have way more opportunities if he represented Chile. However, Acosta was not able to represent Chile, as he did not have Cuba's permission. As a result, Acosta worked as a security guard for two years without training of any kind while trying to get permission. When he got consent in 2017, he started competing internationally again, residing in the Chilean Olympic Center.

He quickly saw results during his first year officially competing for Chile, earning a silver medal from the Pan American Championships and a bronze medal from the World Championships. In 2018, Acosta was granted Chilean citizenship. During the year, he went on to win a bronze medal at the Pan American Championships, a gold medal at the South American Games, and placed eighth at the World Championships. In 2019 he earned a bronze at the Pan American Championships and competed at multiple Grand Prix around Europe. In 2020, he won the Pan American Wrestling Olympic Qualification Tournament and earned a spot at the 2020 Summer Olympics. He competed in the men's 130 kg event.

He won one of the bronze medals in his event at the 2022 Pan American Wrestling Championships held in Acapulco, Mexico. He won the gold medal in his event at the 2022 Bolivarian Games held in Valledupar, Colombia. He competed in the 130kg event at the 2022 World Wrestling Championships held in Belgrade, Serbia. He won the gold medal in his event at the 2022 South American Games held in Asunción, Paraguay.

Achievements

References

External links 

 
 
 

1988 births
Living people
Chilean male sport wrestlers
Wrestlers at the 2019 Pan American Games
Pan American Games bronze medalists for Chile
Pan American Games medalists in wrestling
South American Games medalists in wrestling
Competitors at the 2018 South American Games
Competitors at the 2022 South American Games
South American Games gold medalists for Chile
World Wrestling Championships medalists
Naturalized citizens of Chile
Medalists at the 2019 Pan American Games
Wrestlers at the 2020 Summer Olympics
Olympic wrestlers of Chile
20th-century Cuban people
21st-century Cuban people
20th-century Chilean people
21st-century Chilean people